San Ygnacio Creek is a small stream of water located in Webb County, Texas which runs through Laredo, Texas. The creek is formed 11 miles northwest of Laredo, Texas and runs southwest for  until the creek connects to the Lake Casa Blanca. The terrain surrounding the creek is mostly clay. The vegetation surrounding the creek is mostly made up of mesquite, cacti, and grasses. San Ygnacio Creek does not cross any major highway.

Coordinates
 Source:  Webb County, Texas
 Mouth:  Casa Blanca Lake at Laredo, Texas

See also
 List of tributaries of the Rio Grande
 List of rivers of Texas

References

Tributaries of the Rio Grande
Geography of Laredo, Texas
Rivers of Texas